A swagman was a transient labourer who travelled by foot from farm to farm carrying his belongings in a swag.

Swagman or Swagg Man may also refer to:

Swagman (comics)
Swagman Restaurant, in Ferntree Gully, Melbourne, Australia
Swagman (video game)
The Swagman, a 1965 Australian television play
Swagg Man, (born 1988) French rapper from Tunisia, Tunis

See also